Fräulein Devil, also known as Captive Women 4, Elsa: Fraulein SS and Fraulein Kitty, is a 1977 French Nazi exploitation film.

Plot
This stars Malisa Longo as the cruel Nazi Elsa, a former hooker with a penchant for S&M, a love for leather boots and nakedness, and a hatred of the French Resistance. It is set during the final days of World War II. The Third Reich plans to reward good Nazi officers and weed out traitors by sending a "Pleasure Train" through Europe. The train is populated by beautiful prostitutes who will service soldiers while gaining info on those who had betrayed the Reich.

Background
Malisa Longo had previously played a small role in the successful 1976 film Salon Kitty, which landed her the lead roles in two French imitation films, Fräulein Devil and Helga, She Wolf of Spilberg, both of which were shot back-to-back in 1977; the former was shot on the same sets as Train Spécial Pour SS (aka Hitler's Lust Train), a nearly identical film without Longo's involvement from a few months previously. All three films utilized the same director, crew, and supporting cast.

The trio of French films follows the formula of the 1974 hit Ilsa, She Wolf of the SS which starred Dyanne Thorne as a brutal prison camp commandant, however, Fräulein Devil also borrowed some plot and stylistic elements from Salon Kitty, which allowed the film to be successfully advertised in both North American and European markets with separate emphasis; The "war adventure stories" style of the Ilsa series in the former and the Nazi brothel gimmick in the latter.

External links
 

1977 films
French exploitation films
Nazi exploitation films
1970s exploitation films
1970s English-language films
1970s French films